High School Confidential is an eight-part documentary television series created by Sharon Liese, following twelve high school teenagers from Blue Valley Northwest High. The series airs on WE: Women's Entertainment (WE TV). The original run began on March 10, 2008, and concluded on April 28, 2008.

References

External links

2000s American reality television series
2008 American television series debuts
2008 American television series endings
Television series by New Line Television